The exploration of politics in science fiction is arguably older than the identification of the genre.  One of the earliest works of modern science fiction, H. G. Wells’ The Time Machine, is an extrapolation of the class structure of the United Kingdom of his time, an extreme form of social Darwinism; during tens of thousands of years, human beings have evolved into two different species based on their social class.

Speculative societies
Most story and novel-length works of science fiction include speculation (directly or indirectly) on modes of life and behaviour. They are sometimes allegorical and often serious attempts to model possible future societies, political institutions and systems. Examples include Harry Harrison's novel Make Room! Make Room!, The Dispossessed by Ursula K. Le Guin; and the Hostile Takeover Trilogy by S. Andrew Swann. 
Imagined societies may be based on very different assumptions. Often the future is modeled on historic forms - feudalism,  or in the case of The Foundation series, the Roman Empire.  A common theme is the integration of humanity into some greater interstellar society. A popular modern example is the Uplift series by David Brin where a species' status is defined based on the concept of biologically uplifting other species.

Utopian societies

The term utopia was invented by Thomas More as the title of his Latin book De Optimo Reipublicae Statu deque Nova Insula Utopia (circa 1516), known more commonly as Utopia. He created the word "utopia" to suggest two Greek neologisms simultaneously: outopia (no place) and eutopia (good place). More depicts a rationally organised society, through the narration of an explorer who discovers it—Raphael Hythlodaeus. Utopia is a republic where all property is held in common. In addition, it has few laws, no lawyers and rarely sends its citizens to war, but hires mercenaries from among its war-prone neighbours.

Generally speaking, utopias are generally societies whose author believes either perfect, or as perfect as can be attainable.  Ernest Callenbach's Ecotopia is a contemporary example.  This can cause some confusion, in that some works generally recognized as “utopian”, such as Plato's Republic, can come across as much less than ideal to a modern reader.  They are one of the smaller subsets of political science fiction, possibly because it is difficult to create dramatic tension in a world the author believes is perfect.  Various authors get around this problem by postulating problems in the utopian society, such L. Neil Smith does.  Other ways of presenting a utopian society in science fiction, is to send characters outside it to explore beyond its confines (ala Star Trek), or focus on an outsider character entering the society, as in Aldous Huxley’s Brave New World.  This last method is often used to show that the utopian society shown is actually a dystopia.  Kim Stanley Robinson's approach in The Mars Trilogy involved exploring the creation of utopian and ecotopian societies on Mars.

Another option for a Utopian society can be found in robotocracy, or the rule of Robots or Computers, with the theory that a programmed machine can dispassionately provide for the welfare of all.  Examples of this include various works of Isaac Asimov and the planet of Sigma Draconis VI in the Star Trek episode "Spock's Brain".  If the machine rule becomes harsh or oppressive, it may become a dystopia instead.

Dystopian societies

Dystopias are societies where the author illustrates the worst that can happen.  Usually this encompasses extrapolating trends the author sees as dangerous. During the 20th century many examples were written in reaction to the rise of Nazism, Communism and Religious Fundamentalism:

Nineteen Eighty-Four by George Orwell which illustrates the ultimate totalitarian state in which the government is in control of every aspect of human existence, using propaganda, universal surveillance, and torture.
The Man in the High Castle by Philip K. Dick was written after the war in response to Fascism. It is set in a world where the Axis forces have won World War II and are rival superpowers. In it the main characters argue and are involved in politics and power.
The Handmaid's Tale by Margaret Atwood tells the tale of a woman caught up in a fundamentalist Christian dictatorship where women are forced into a system of sexual slavery for the ruling patriarchy.

It is important to keep in mind that scenarios which some would describe as dystopic, others would describe as utopian. Norman Spinrad's novel The Iron Dream was generally recognised to be a dystopic novel, but lauded by neo-Nazis as a utopia.

Politics
Often the political focus of a science fiction novel is less on the social order, but how people maneuver and achieve their agendas within a given system. Many space operas rely on vast interstellar bureaucracies to drive their plots (see: Galactic empire). George Lucas's famous Star Wars saga features political science modeled after historic events. The Retief stories by Keith Laumer and the Chanur books by C. J. Cherryh have politics and political maneuverings as some of the main themes, and Frank Herbert's Dune books offer advanced explorations of human politics, including the dovetailing economics. Often this focus can descend into conspiracy and paranoia where the premise is that there are secret forces out to get the protagonists, the seminal example of which is the Illuminatus! Trilogy. Most commonly, science fiction deals with the political fallout of its own premises.  A story will posit some new event or technology and explore its political dimensions; this includes most techno-thrillers but also encompasses a large body of traditional science fiction. An example is the Philip K. Dick story The Minority Report (upon which the film starring Tom Cruise is based), which introduces the idea of perfectly predicting a crime of violence so the perpetrator can be arrested before the crime is committed, and the political and legal ramifications of actually using such a system.

Examples by category
 Adhocracy
 Cory Doctorow, Down and Out in the Magic Kingdom 
 Alien Contact
 Although encounters between humanity and non-human intelligences serve as the primary theme in the series of novels by Arthur C. Clarke that began with 2001: A Space Odyssey, they also explore the irrationality produced by Cold War military secrecy.
 Carl Sagan, Contact
 Peter Watts, Blindsight
 Anarchy

 The Dispossessed, by Ursula K. Le Guin, depicts a functional and liberated (but materially impoverished) anarcho-syndicalist society and contrasts it against its wealthy (but exploitative) capitalist neighbor.  
 In the Culture series by Iain M. Banks, the societies of humanity have essentially evolved into political anarchies; people associate or cooperate entirely on a voluntary basis for mutual support.  There are organisations for cooperative ventures such as defense, exploration and even espionage, but they are run on an entirely voluntary basis.  Advanced technology, cultural evolution and the planned economy liberate humanity from inequality and economic scarcity. 
 In The Moon Is a Harsh Mistress, Robert A. Heinlein presents a human society on the Moon as an ideal anarchy, populated by political exiles and held together by the need for cooperation to ensure mutual survival, coupled with the ease for revenge in the event of harm. The revolutionaries in The Moon Is a Harsh Mistress are vaguely anarcho-capitalist.
The LaNague Federation series of novels and stories by F. Paul Wilson. 
 The Fall Revolution books of Ken MacLeod.  Various ideas for political systems are explored, ranging from anarcho-capitalism to a kind of selfish socialism.
 Assassination
 Poul Anderson.  1968.  "A Man to My Wounding," in The Horn of Time.  New York: Signet.  No ISBN.  pages 27–43.  
 H. Beam Piper.  1958.  Lone Star Planet (originally A Planet for Texans) expanded by John J. McGuire .
 Capitalism
 Max Barry. Jennifer Government. 
 Robert A. Heinlein. The Man Who Sold the Moon (Retro Hugo Award, 1951)
 H. G. Wells. The Time Machine.
 F. Paul Wilson.  An Enemy of the State.
 Jack London, The Iron Heel.
 Frederik Pohl and Cyril M. Kornbluth, The Space Merchants.
 Nisi Shawl. Everfair
 Communism
Alexander Bogdanov, Red Star
 Brian Aldiss, Enemies of the System 
 Ecology

 David Brin, Earth.
 Kim Stanley Robinson. Mars Trilogy, Three Californias Trilogy
 Frank Herbert.  The Dune novels
 Ernest Callenbach, Ecotopia: The Notebooks and Reports of William Weston.
 Karen Traviss, City of Pearl
 Economics
 Robert A. Heinlein.  For Us, The Living
 Frank Herbert.  The Dune novels (specifically hydraulic despotism and its effects)
 Mack Reynolds.  Tomorrow May Be Different
 Manu Saadia, Trekonomics
Charles Stross, Neptune's Brood
 Eugenics

 C. J. Cherryh.  Cyteen.
 Aldous Huxley. Brave New World.
 Frank Herbert.  The Dune novels (see Bene Gesserit for a detailed review).
 Fascism
 Norman Spinrad. The Iron Dream. 
 Philip K. Dick. The Man in the High Castle 
 Jack London. The Iron Heel
 Jo Walton. Farthing
 The Sound of His Horn by the senior British diplomat John William Wall (under the pen name of Sarban) — originally a mass market paperback published in the U.S., UK, Spain and Commonwealth countries, it was republished in hardback by Tartarus Press. It relates the story of a prisoner of war transported to a nazi controlled world 100 years on from World War II. He is hunted by a "Reichsforester" (a title Hermann Göring held during the Third Reich). He takes refuge with genetically mutilated undesirables — one of the first portrayals of genetic manipulation.
 Legal personality
 Roger MacBride Allen.  1992.  The Modular Man.  New York: Bantam. .
 Libertarianism

 L. Neil Smith an author of libertarian science fiction currently writing.  In the series beginning with The Probability Broach he examines an alternate history world where the United States took a substantial turn away from centralized authority shortly after its founding.  Arguably a libertarian utopia the plots of his novels generally deal with threats to this social order.
 Many of Robert A. Heinlein's books included libertarianism as a prominent theme.  Some notable examples include The Moon Is a Harsh Mistress, Time Enough for Love, Stranger in a Strange Land, and the posthumously published For Us, the Living.
 Limited-franchise republic 
 In Starship Troopers Robert A. Heinlein describes a state in which citizens must earn voting rights and the right to hold electoral office and certain civil service jobs by completing a period of federal service.
 Militarism

 In Starship Troopers, Robert A. Heinlein describes a future Earth in which a world government is run by military veterans who despise the previous "social scientists" that ran the world.
 Joe Haldeman, The Forever War
 Mind reading and mind control

 Alfred Bester.  1953.  The Demolished Man.
 Thomas M. Disch.  1968.  Camp Concentration.
 Greag Bear, Eon
 National security state
 Rex Gordon.  1969. The Yellow Fraction. New York: Ace.   . pages. 26–28.
 Nepotism
 John Barnes.  2001. The Merchants of Souls. New York: Tor.  .  pages 119–120.
 P2P system
 Daniel Suarez, Freedom™
 Pacifism
 Ursula K. Le Guin.  The Dispossessed.
 Plutocracy
 Max Barry.  2003.  Jennifer Government.  New York: Vintage.  .  pages 238–239.
 Jonathan Morris. Doctor Who: Anachrophobia. London: BBC Books. .
 Proportional representation
 David Brin.  1999.  Foundation's Triumph.  New York: Harper Torch.  .  page 65.
 Kim Stanley Robinson. 1996. Blue Mars
 Scott Westerfeld.  2003.  The Killing of Worlds.  New York: Tor.  .  page 298.
 Racism

 Malorie Blackman. Noughts & Crosses series.
 Norman Spinrad. Bug Jack Barron.
 Revolution
 Robert A. Heinlein. The Moon Is a Harsh Mistress. 
 Norman Spinrad. The Men in the Jungle.
 Frank Herbert.  The Dune novels
 Slavery
 Robert A. Heinlein. Citizen of the Galaxy
 Socialism
 In For Us, The Living: A Comedy of Customs, Robert A. Heinlein describes a future United States of America with liberal social values and a social credit or anti-bank economic system.  
 The Fall Revolution books of Ken MacLeod.
 The Mars Trilogy books of Kim Stanley Robinson.
 Theocracy
 In Revolt in 2100, Robert A. Heinlein describes a future conservative Christian theocracy ruling what had been the United States of America.
 Margaret Atwood. The Handmaid's Tale.
 Allen Steele. Coyote.
 Ian Stewart & Jack Cohen. Heaven.
 Ben Bova.  In his Grand Tour series Earth is run by a loose federation of theocracies.
 Totalitarianism

 George Orwell. Nineteen Eighty-Four.
 Yevgeny Zamyatin. We
 John Barnes explores the nature of totalitarianism in his Century Next Door novels: Candle and The Sky So Big and Black, which involve the threat of a hegemonic software program One True that takes control of individual human minds and entire human societies.  
 Frank Herbert.  The Dune novels.
 Arkady and Boris Strugatsky. Hard to Be a God
 Treason
 C. J. Cherryh. Downbelow Station.
 Rex Gordon.  1969. The Yellow Fraction. New York: Ace.    . Pp. 28–30.

See also
 Utopian and dystopian fiction
 Social science fiction
Postmodern literature

References

Thomas M. Disch.  1998.  The Dreams Our Stuff is Made Of: How Science Fiction Conquered the World.  New York: Touchstone Books. .

External links
50 fantasy and science fiction works that socialists should read — by China Miéville
Anarchism and science fiction: a reading list
 "Killer Bs" (Brin, Benford, Bear, Baxter and B-, er, Vinge) mailing list: frequent political discussions, mostly related David Brin's ideas

Science fiction themes
Social science fiction
Works about politics
Politics-related lists